Adama Stadium (Oromo: Istaadiyamii Adaaamaa), officially known as Adama Abebe Bikila Stadium, is a multi-use stadium in Adama, Oromia, Ethiopia.  It is used mostly for football matches and serves as the home stadium of Adama City.  The stadium has a capacity of 4,000 people.

External links
World Stadiums

Multi-purpose stadiums in Ethiopia
Football venues in Ethiopia